Relief, formerly known as Panorama, is a public affairs newsmagazine series in Canada, airing nightly in Ontario on TFO, the Franco-Ontarian public television network.

The series is hosted by Gisèle Quenneville. Reporters associated with the series include Melanie Routhier-Boudreau, Isabelle Brunet, Marie Duchesneau, Luce Gauthier, Frédéric Projean and Chantal Racine. Longtime host Pierre Granger retired from the series in 2009. The series was renamed RelieF in fall 2010.

The show airs seven nights a week at 7 p.m. From Monday to Thursday, it airs news and public affairs. On Fridays, the program airs documentary programming. On Saturdays, it airs a "week in review" edition, and on Sundays it airs an arts and culture magazine.

References

External links
 Relief

2000s Canadian television news shows
TFO original programming
Television shows filmed in Toronto
2010s Canadian television news shows